The Giardini Margherita is a park in Bologna, Italy, located just south of the city centre.

History 
The park has been opened on 6 July 1879 by the city who bought the land that was part of an ancient Convent. The project made by Ernesto Baldo Bertone di Sambuy is a typical English landscape garden, similar to Parco Sempione in Milan.

Curiosity 
In the main square of the park there is a liberty building, used for many years as an astronomical observatory. The use is now made almost impossible by light pollution.

Monuments and historic places of Bologna
Parks in Emilia-Romagna
Protected areas established in 1879
1879 establishments in Italy